The 1992 Davis Cup (also known as the 1992 Davis Cup by NEC for sponsorship purposes) was the 81st edition of the Davis Cup, the most important tournament between national teams in men's tennis. 93 teams would enter the competition, 16 in the World Group, 21 in the Americas Zone, 23 in the Asia/Oceania Zone, and 33 in the Europe/Africa Zone. Due to the increased number of entries, the tournament was expanded to add a Group III in all zones, with promotion and relegation between it and Group II. Puerto Rico and Qatar made their first appearances in the tournament, and former champions South Africa returned to the tournament for the first time since 1978.

The United States defeated Switzerland in the final, held at the Tarrant County Convention Center in Fort Worth, Texas, United States, on 4–6 December, to win their 30th title overall.

World Group

Draw

Final

World Group Qualifying Round

Date: 25–27 September

The eight losing teams in the World Group first round ties and eight winners of the Zonal Group I final round ties competed in the World Group Qualifying Round for spots in the 1993 World Group.

 ,  and  remain in the World Group in 1993.
 ,  and  remain in Zonal Group I in 1993.

Americas Zone

Group I

Group II

Group III
 Venue: Maya Country Club, San Salvador, El Salvador
 Date: 19–22 March

Group A

Group B

  and  promoted to Group II in 1993.

Asia/Oceania Zone

Group I

  relegated to Group II in 1993.

  and  advance to World Group Qualifying Round.

Group II

Group III
 Venue: Isa Town Tennis Courts, Manama, Bahrain
 Date: 20–26 April

  and  promoted to Group II in 1993.

Europe/Africa Zone

Group I

Group II

Group III
 Venue: Tennis Club de Tunis, Tunis, Tunisia
 Date: 29 April–3 May

Notes

References
General

Specific

External links
Davis Cup Official Website

 
Davis Cups by year
Davis Cup
Davis Cup
Davis Cup
International sports competitions in Texas